The Charition mime is a Greek theatre play, in fact more properly to be called a farce or burlesque rather than a mime, which is found in Papyrus Oxyrhynchus 413. The manuscript, which is possibly incomplete, is untitled, and the play's name comes from the name of its protagonist. It is approximately dated to the 2nd century BCE, and the play was probably performed in Egypt, where the manuscript was found.

The play alludes to earlier texts such as Iphigenia in Tauris and Odyssey. Charition (Χαριτίων), the protagonist, is a Greek girl held captive at a temple in India (like Iphigenia), and her brother comes to her rescue. The Greeks escape by getting the Indian king drunk, an element possibly borrowed from Odyssey. The introduction of humorous elements suggest that it may originally have been written as a spoof. The play's character makes it almost a burlesque, representing a type of drama which was prior to the play's discovery not known in antiquity.  The manuscript contains signs at various points which are almost certainly instructions to play percussion instruments and, possibly, the aulos, a Greek double-piped reed instrument, which suggests that the use of music in Greek mime was much more extensive than was earlier thought.

Plot 

Chariton, a beautiful Greek girl, is captured by (or sold to) the king of a coastal kingdom in India. The king keeps her at the temple of the moon goddess (as a temple girl or a priestess). A Greek search party, including her brother and a jester, arrives to rescue her, after crossing the Indian Ocean. As Chariton, her brother and the fool are discussing their escape, a group of Indian women returning from a hunt encounter them. The jester defends the Greeks with his farts. He asks Chariton to steal items from the temple, but she refuses arguing that robbery would make the gods angry. On the brother's suggestion, the Greeks serve wine to the Indian king and his subjects, intoxicating them. The characters, including the king, then perform a dance for the moon goddess. The Greeks then discuss tying up the king, who has tripped over (as suggested by loud drums at the end of the music). The end of the play is lost, but the Greeks escape to their ship.

Indian language dialogues 

One of the most interesting features of the skit is the appearance of a number of characters who speak dialogues in an unknown language. This language may partly or wholly represent  Kannada language of South India. It was included as amusing gibberish for the contemporary audience, who did not understand it.

Shortly after the papyrus' modern publication, Dr. E. Hultzsch, a noted German indologist who had a strong command of the Dravidian languages, claimed that the words represented an ancient form of Kannada, and suggested possible readings for the dialogues in question which made sense in the context in which they were uttered, but couldn't justify their claims and lost it. His findings were criticised by others at the time for being speculative, but even most of Hultzsch's critics accepted that the language must have been a Dravidian language.

 Kannada
 Apart from E. Hultzsch, B. A. Saletore's explanation of the locale of the story and Shastri's analysis of the language of the play suggest it is a form of Kannada. The subsequent discovery of the Halmidi inscription, which contains a form of Kannada much earlier than the forms known at the time Hultzsch wrote his article, confirms many of his theories on the evolution of the language and might therefore add support to his readings.

 Tulu
 According to the Indian scholars Shivaprasad Rai (1985) and U. Padmanabha Upadhyaya (1996), the Indian language used in the play is Tulu. Manohar Laxman Varadpande identified the kingdom mentioned in the play with Malpe (which lies in the Tulu Nadu region).

References

External links
A translation of the mime

Ancient Greek plays
Bactrian and Indian Hellenistic period